Bonnie L. Dasse (born July 22, 1959, in Abilene, Texas) is a retired female track and field athlete from the United States, who competed in the women's shot put event. She twice represented her native country at the Summer Olympics: 1988 and 1992. She tested positive for the banned substance clenbuterol at the 1992 Olympics.

Achievements

References

1959 births
Living people
American female shot putters
Athletes (track and field) at the 1988 Summer Olympics
Athletes (track and field) at the 1992 Summer Olympics
Olympic track and field athletes of the United States
Sportspeople from Abilene, Texas
American sportspeople in doping cases
Doping cases in athletics
San Diego State Aztecs women's track and field athletes